Fenton is an unincorporated community in Whiteside County, Illinois. The community has a post office with ZIP code 61251.

References

Unincorporated communities in Whiteside County, Illinois
Unincorporated communities in Illinois